Andrea Jourdan (born 1956) is a Canadian chef, ghost writer and a culinary author with over 100 published cookbooks.

Early life
Andrea Jourdan was born in Baie-Comeau, Quebec, Canada. She studied political science and French literature.

Career
After several years in France during which she encountered chefs Joël Robuchon and Bernard Loiseau, Andrea and her husband, American film director Philip Jourdan, opened their first restaurant Chez toi chez moi in Los Angeles.  A second restaurant was opened in Montreal.  Her love for European cuisine sees her return to Europe, more specifically in Italy, where she hosted the TV series Mangia! Mangia! created for the American market  and which aired from 1996 to 1998. She then wrote and self-published her first cookbook in English, The Extra Virgin Olive Oil of Lucca which provides several recipes with the product and details numerous olive oil producers of Lucca in Tuscany.

In 2001, Andrea Jourdan opened a gourmet grocery store in Montreal called Les Petits Plaisirs d'Andrea and closed it due to unfortunate circumstances. Along with TV host and actress Francine Ruel, she participated for 2 seasons (2002-2004) on the summer TV series "L'été c'est péché" (summer is a sin), where several local celebrities collaborated daily discussing aspects of each deadly sin. For author Chrystine Brouillet, chef Ian Perreault and Andrea Jourdan, the theme was gluttony .

In 2011, Andrea Jourdan published her first cookbook in French, Spoom, Desserts envoûtants which won in 2012 the prestigious Gourmand World Cookbook Awards for Best Photography of cookbooks published in French Canada. Followed two best-selling titles on tartares, carpaccios and pies: Tartares et Carpaccios and Tartes en folie.

Since 2013, her Complètement cookbook series has been published by Éditions de l'Homme and titles are e-published in English under the name Absolutely . The concept of each title is to propose 30 original recipes around a single subject. Two of her cookbooks have won the coveted Gourmand World Cookbook Awards in 2015: Recevoir toute l'année avec Andrea (Best Entertaining cookbook - French Canada) and Le garde-manger d'Andrea (Best Easy Recipes cookbook - French Canada). Andrea Jourdan is also a weekly columnist to the "Food" section (Saveurs) in the newspaper Journal de Montréal After closing the first gourmet shop Les Petits Plaisirs d'Andrea on Laurier Street,  Andrea opened on March 9, 2016, a new gourmet location, Andrea Jourdan La Boutique in Jean-Talon Market, where she shares a variety of original food products imported from all over the world as well as her own unique culinary creations, amongst which her infamous FBV (fraise-basilic-vodka or strawberry basil vodka jam).

Publications

, Jourdan has written over 100 cookbooks. She has ghostwritten many cookbooks for several Canadian chefs. See list of publications below.

The Extra Virgin Olive Oil of Lucca, Andrea's Kitchen Books, 1998. 
Spoom, Desserts envoûtants, Éditions Transcontinental, 2011. 
Tartares & Carpaccios, Éditions Transcontinental, 2012. 
Tartes en folie, Éditions Transcontinental, 2012. 
Burgers & Pizzas, Marshall Cavendish, 2012. 
Cupcakes & Muffins, Marshall Cavendish, 2012. 
Pies & Quiches, Marshall Cavendish, 2012. 
Soups & Sandwiches, Marshall Cavendish, 2012. 
Sweets & Desserts, Marshall Cavendish, 2012. 
Complètement Cheesecakes, Les Éditions de l'Homme, 2012. 
Complètement Crevettes, Les Éditions de l'Homme, 2012. 
Complètement Cru, Les Éditions de l'Homme, 2012. 
Complètement Desserts en pots, Les Éditions de l'Homme, 2012. 
Complètement Limonades, Les Éditions de l'Homme, 2012. 
Complètement Quinoa, Les Éditions de l'Homme, 2012. 
Complètement Salades, Les Éditions de l'Homme, 2012. 
Complètement Smoothies, Les Éditions de l'Homme, 2012. 
Complètement Soupes d'automne, Les Éditions de l'Homme, 2012. 
Complètement Soupes froides, Les Éditions de l'Homme, 2012. 
Complètement Tartares, Les Éditions de l'Homme, 2012. 
Complètement Tomates, Les Éditions de l'Homme, 2012. 
Absolutely Autumn Soups, AF Gourmet, 2012
Absolutely Cheesecake, AF Gourmet, 2012
Absolutely Chicken, AF Gourmet, 2012
Absolutely Cold Soups, AF Gourmet, 2012
Absolutely Cookies, AF Gourmet, 2012
Absolutely Crepes, AF Gourmet, 2012
Absolutely Desserts in a Jar, AF Gourmet, 2012
Absolutely Ice Cream, AF Gourmet, 2012
Absolutely Lasagna, AF Gourmet, 2012
Absolutely Lemonade, AF Gourmet, 2012
Absolutely Quinoa, AF Gourmet, 2012
Absolutely Raw, AF Gourmet, 2012
Absolutely Risottos, AF Gourmet, 2012
Absolutely Salads, AF Gourmet, 2012
Absolutely Salmon, AF Gourmet, 2012
Absolutely Shrimp, AF Gourmet, 2012
Absolutely Smoothies, AF Gourmet, 2012
Absolutely Tajine, AF Gourmet, 2012
Absolutely Tartare, AF Gourmet, 2012
Absolutely Tomatoes, AF Gourmet, 2012
Chicken Meals, Marshall Cavendish, 2013. 
Ice Creams & Sorbets, Marshall Cavendish, 2013. 
Lasagne & Risottos, Marshall Cavendish, 2013. 
Pancakes & Waffles, Marshall Cavendish, 2013. 
Ultimate Cookies, Marshall Cavendish, 2013. 
150 Best Desserts in a Jar, Robert Rose, 2013. 
Desserts en pots. 150 recettes irrésistibles, Les Éditions de l'Homme, 2013. 
Complètement Courges, Les Éditions de l'Homme, 2013. 
Complètement Gâteaux au chocolat, Les Éditions de l'Homme, 2013. 
Complètement Gratins, Les Éditions de l'Homme, 2013. 
Complètement Noël, Les Éditions de l'Homme, 2013. 
Complètement Osso buco, Les Éditions de l'Homme, 2013. 
Complètement Burgers, Les Éditions de l'Homme, 2014. 
Complètement Érable, Les Éditions de l'Homme, 2014. 
Complètement Fraises, Les Éditions de l'Homme, 2014. 
Complètement Pétoncles, Les Éditions de l'Homme, 2014. 
Les desserts faciles d'Andrea, Éditions Coup d'œil, 2014. 
Complètement Biscuits, Les Éditions de l'Homme, 2014. 
Complètement Lasagnes, Les Éditions de l'Homme, 2014. 
Complètement Poulet, Les Éditions de l'Homme, 2014. 
Complètement Risottos, Les Éditions de l'Homme, 2014. 
La mijoteuse facile d'Andrea, Éditions Coup d'œil, 2014. 
Le garde-manger d'Andrea, Éditions Goélette, 2014. 
Recevoir toute l'année avec Andrea, Éditions Coup d'œil, 2014. 
Grillades chez soi, Éditions Coup d'œil, 2014. 
Homard et crabe chez soi, Éditions Coup d'œil, 2014. 
Complètement Crème glacée, Les Éditions de l'Homme, 2014. 
Complètement Noix de coco, Les Éditions de l'Homme, 2014. 
Complètement Pommes, Les Éditions de l'Homme, 2014. 
Complètement Saumon, Les Éditions de l'Homme, 2014. 
Le poêlon à toutes les sauces, Éditions Coup d'œil, 2015. 
La saison des conserves avec Claudette Dion, Éditions Édito, 2015. 
Sortez vos mijoteuses avec Claudette Dion, Éditions Édito, 2015. 
Complètement Asperges, Les Éditions de l'Homme, 2015. 
Complètement Brochettes, Les Éditions de l'Homme, 2015. 
Complètement Crêpes, Les Éditions de l'Homme, 2015. 
Complètement Tajines, Les Éditions de l'Homme, 2015. 
Les super aliments à toutes les sauces, Éditions Coup d'œil, 2016. 
Irrésistible érable, une histoire d'amour en 100 recettes, Éditions Édito, 2016. 
Chasse et pêche : 100 recettes de gibier et de poissons du Québec, Éditions Coup d'œil, 2016. 
Simplement BBQ : 110 recettes du Journal de Montréal, Éditions du Journal de Montréal, 2018. 
Caviar (par Andrea), Andrea Jourdan Éditions, September 2018. 
Caviar (by Andrea), Andrea Jourdan Éditions, September 2018. 
Érable (par Andrea), Andrea Jourdan Éditions, September 2018. 
Maple (by Andrea), Andrea Jourdan Éditions, September 2018. 
Foie gras (par Andrea), Andrea Jourdan Éditions, September 2018. 
Foie Gras (by Andrea), Andrea Jourdan Éditions, September 2018. 
Truffe (par Andrea), Andrea Jourdan Éditions, September 2018. 
Truffle (by Andrea), Andrea Jourdan Éditions, September 2018. 
Coffret 4 livres gourmands (tome 1), Andrea Jourdan Éditions, September 2018. . Contains cookbooks in French: Caviar, Érable, Foie Gras and Truffe, part of the series Par Andrea.
4-Volume Cookbook Set (Vol 1), Andrea Jourdan Éditions, September 2018. . Contains cookbooks in English: Caviar, Foie Gras, Maple & Truffle part of the series By Andrea.
Cuisiner au vin blanc, Andrea Jourdan Éditions, September 2018. 
Cuisiner au vin rouge, Andrea Jourdan Éditions, September 2018. 
Cooking with Red Wine, Andrea Jourdan Éditions, September 2018. 
Cooking with White Wine, Andrea Jourdan Éditions, September 2018.

Translations

The Great Book of Fish, Book Sales, 1998. .
The Great Book of Mediterranean Cuisine, Book Sales, 1998. .
The Great Book of Pasta, Book Sales, 1998. .

Collaborations

100 Personnalités 100 Recettes, Fondation les Ailes de la Mode, 2002. .
Introduction of cookbook BBQ au Max (author: Max Lavoie), Guy Saint-Jean Éditeur, 2015. .
Recettes du Québec (various authors), Éditions Transcontinental, 2012. . In this cookbook, Andrea Jourdan is credited as Food Stylist.

References

Canadian women chefs
21st-century Canadian women writers
People from Baie-Comeau
Writers from Quebec
Canadian cookbook writers
Canadian expatriates in France
Women chefs
Canadian expatriates in the United States
20th-century Canadian women writers
1956 births
Living people